Kurwongbah is an electoral district of the Legislative Assembly in the Australian state of Queensland which existed at first from 1992 to 2009, and was re-introduced for the 2017 state election. It is named after Lake Kurwongbah.The district is based in the Moreton Bay Region.

First incarnation 
The first incarnation of the electoral district of Kurwongbah included the suburbs of Kurwongbah, Bray Park, Eatons Hill, Samsonvale and Strathpine. The seat was first contested at the 1992 state election, essentially as a reconfigured version of Pine Rivers.

In 2008, Kurwongbah was abolished—with effect at the 2009 state election—as a result of the redistribution undertaken by the Electoral Commission of Queensland. It was replaced by a recreated Pine Rivers, which is very similar in form to the old Kurwongbah.

Second incarnation 
In the 2017 redistribution, Kurwongbah was created again, largely replacing the abolished seat of Kallangur. However, as the suburb of Kallangur is not in the new electorate, the electoral district needed to be renamed. It was named Kurwongbah after Lake Kurwongbah.

From results of the 2015 state election, Kurwongbah was estimated to be a safe seat for the Labor Party with a margin of 7.1% coming into the 2017 state election. The prediction was accurate as Labor won the seat.

Members for Kurwongbah

Election results

See also
 Electoral districts of Queensland
 Members of the Queensland Legislative Assembly by year
 :Category:Members of the Queensland Legislative Assembly by name

References

External links
 ABC profile

Electoral districts of Queensland